Player One Amusement Group (P1AG), formerly Cineplex Starburst, is a Canadian arcade game distributor. It is a subsidiary of Cineplex Entertainment, and was created via the successive mergers and acquisitions of Starburst Coin Machine, Brady Distributing, Premier Amusements, Sega Amusement Works, Tricorp Amusements, and Dandy Amusements.

The company also owns Playdium, a large amusement centre in Mississauga, Ontario.

History

Origin Timeline:
 1944 - Brady Distributing established
 1949 - Premier Amusements established (Premier Amusements originally started as Melody Music Company)
 1974 - Sega Amusement Works (SAW) established. Formally, Sunshine Company.
 1975 - Starburst Coin Machine established 
 1982 - Tricorp Amusements established
 1994 - Playdium established 
 2007 - Starburst Coin Machine acquires Playdium and Premier Amusements 
 2012 - Starburst Coin Machine and Cineplex Entertainment partner to create Cineplex Starburst (also known as CSI)
 2015 - Brady Distributing and Cineplex Starburst partner to create Brady Starburst
 2016 - Tricorp Amusements and SAW acquired by Cineplex Starburst
 2016 - Cineplex Starburst, Brady Starburst, Premier Amusements, Tricorp Amusements and SAW become "Player One Amusement Group"
 2017 - Dandy Amusements acquired by Player One Amusement Group
 2020 - Mississauga Playdium permanently closed
2021 - Dartmouth, Nova Scotia location opens

Brands

Playdium

Playdium is a family entertainment centre chain owned by Cineplex Entertainment through its subsidiary Player One Amusement Group. The former flagship location in Mississauga, Ontario, Canada launched as Sega City @ Playdium near Square One Shopping Centre on September 7, 1996. The  centre cost CA$17 million to build and included an arcade, batting cages, go-karts and mini-golf. A partnership with Sega GameWorks, it featured many arcade games from that company such as Daytona USA, and eight-player racing setups for Indy 500 (as Virtua Indy) and Manx TT Super Bike. Indy 500 remains available today. In 1999, the centre was renamed to Playdium. The company opened up two more locations in Brampton and Whitby in late 2019.

Some arcade games include Mario Kart Arcade GP DX, Luigi's Mansion Arcade, Pac-Man's Arcade Party and two Pump It Up machines (Pump It Up 2017 Prime 2 and Pump It Up 2015 Prime). The arcade was previously curated into themed "communities" such as Contact, Music, Speed and Sports, but this is no longer the case. Play credit and tickets for games are loaded on a digital game card and can be purchased in units to use at any time or in time blocks of two hours. While all games require credit, redemption games cannot use time blocks and may also award digital tickets to successful players. A few other machines also cannot use time blocks. Cards from Player One brands are not interchangeable. For example, a Playdium card cannot be used at Xscape, or vice versa.

A baseball dome, formerly with a Toronto Blue Jays partnership, operates year-round and has nine variable-speed batting cages. There is also a Megabytes fast food restaurant on the gaming floor and a full-service mezzanine diner. Megabytes now features marketing similar to Cineplex concession stands and OutTakes restaurants, though at lower prices, while also incorporating a selection of Pizza Pizza and Starbucks menu items. Past cross-promotional partners included HMV Canada, the Toronto Blue Jays (indoor batting cages, baseball camps, and coupons on Blue Jays tickets), the Molson Indy Toronto (the  outdoor go-kart track was formerly known as the Mario Andretti Racetrack), and Roots (the lounge was formerly known as the Roots Treehouse). The outdoors also include an 18-hole miniature golf, and Water Wars.

The company operated four Playdium locations at its peak: Mississauga (next to the Square One Shopping Centre), Toronto (next to Scotiabank Theatre Toronto), Edmonton (inside the West Edmonton Mall) and Burnaby (inside Metropolis at Metrotown and host of official Dance Dance Revolution tournaments in 2000 and 2001). Though the Playdium brand did exist in smaller arcades that are now known as Cinescape or Xscape. The Rec Room is a spiritual successor to Playdium near the former Toronto location and at the former West Edmonton Mall location. A new Rec Room location took over the former Target at Square One Shopping Centre in 2019. Despite this, future plans regarding the nearby Playdium location have yet to be announced. The company also operates The Playdium Store, which retails arcade games and various other home entertainment solutions. On October 15, 2020, it was announced that Playdium would permanently close on November 1 in Mississauga due to redevelopment of the area however its locations in Brampton and Whitby will remain open. On February 20, 2021, Playdium opened its location in Dartmouth Nova Scotia.

Playdium Movie Magic was a DVD video rental shop that operated using automated retail kiosks. It launched in early 2011 and closed in late 2016. Competitors included Le SuperClub Vidéotron, Redbox and Zip.ca kiosks. Contrary to these, Playdium rentals were location-specific and could only be returned at the original kiosk where the DVD was rented.

References

External links
 

 	 

Companies based in Mississauga
Cineplex Entertainment